Kim Phillips (born October 28, 1966) is a former American football defensive back. He played for the New Orleans Saints in 1989, the Buffalo Bills in 1990, the Winnipeg Blue Bombers from 1992 to 1994 and for the Calgary Stampeders and Shreveport Pirates in 1995.

References

1966 births
Living people
American football defensive backs
North Texas Mean Green football players
New Orleans Saints players
Buffalo Bills players
Winnipeg Blue Bombers players
Calgary Stampeders players
Shreveport Pirates players